Harvinder Singh is an Indian paralympic archer. He won bronze medal in the men's singles recurve archery at the 2020 Summer Paralympics. It is the first ever Paralympic medal in archery for India.

See also 

 India at the 2020 Summer Paralympics

References 

Archer Harvinder Singh Biography in Hindi

Living people
Archers at the 2020 Summer Paralympics
Medalists at the 2020 Summer Paralympics
Paralympic archers of India
Paralympic bronze medalists for India
Paralympic medalists in archery
Year of birth missing (living people)
Recipients of the Arjuna Award